Unspoken may refer to:

Film and television
Unspoken, a 2006 film starring William Sadler
Unspoken (film), a 2008  drama film directed by Fien Troch
"Unspoken" (CSI: NY), a 2012 episode of crime drama CSI: NY

Music
Unspoken (band), an American Christian band
Unspoken (Jaci Velasquez album), 2003
Unspoken (Unspoken album), 2014
Unspoken (Chris Potter album), 1997
Unspoken, a 2001 album by Mezarkabul
"Unspoken", a song by Cascada from their 2011 album Original Me
"Unspoken", a song by Four Tet from the 2003 album Rounds
"Unspoken", a song by The Ghost Inside from their 2010 album Returners
"Unspoken", a song by Lacuna Coil from their 2002 album Comalies
"Unspoken", a song by Weezer from their 2010 album Hurley
"Unspoken", a song by Hurts

Other uses
The Unspoken, a fantasy multiplayer game by Insomniac Games
The Unspoken, a Marvel Comics supervillain
Unspoken (play), a 2005 Australian play by Rebecca Clarke